Porto Feliz is a municipality in the Brazilian state of São Paulo. It is part of the Metropolitan Region of Sorocaba. The population is 53,402 (2020 est.) in an area of 556.69 km2. The elevation is 523 m. The largest factory in the city called a Porto Feliz S/A is responsible for the demand for corrugated cardboard packaging of the entire state and all Brazil. The mother of Queen Silvia of Sweden, Alice Soares de Toledo, was born in this city.

References

External links 
 Prefeitura Municipal de Porto Feliz

Municipalities in São Paulo (state)